"K-Lo" is a nickname for:

Kathryn Jean Lopez, conservative columnist
Kenny Lofton, baseball player